Rudolph and Arthur Covered Bridge was a historic wooden covered bridge located in Elk Township and New London Township, Chester County, Pennsylvania.  It was an  Burr truss bridge, constructed in 1880. It had vertical planking and eave-level window openings. It crossed Big Elk Creek.

It was listed on the National Register of Historic Places in 1980, and was delisted in 2022.

The Rudolph and Arthur Covered Bridge was destroyed by remnants of Hurricane Ida on September 1, 2021. Pieces of the bridge washed ashore and dammed at the Chesterville Road/Route 841 bridge over Big Elk Creek.

References 
 

Covered bridges on the National Register of Historic Places in Pennsylvania
Covered bridges in Chester County, Pennsylvania
Bridges completed in 1880
Wooden bridges in Pennsylvania
Bridges in Chester County, Pennsylvania
National Register of Historic Places in Chester County, Pennsylvania
Road bridges on the National Register of Historic Places in Pennsylvania
Burr Truss bridges in the United States
Former National Register of Historic Places in Pennsylvania